Sukarno's Working Cabinet may refer to:

 First Working Cabinet (Sukarno)
 Second Working Cabinet (Sukarno)
 Third Working Cabinet
 Fourth Working Cabinet